The 1991 Ohio Valley Conference men's basketball tournament was the final event of the 1990–91 season in the Ohio Valley Conference. The tournament was held March 2-4, 1991, at Racer Arena in Murray, Kentucky.

Murray State defeated  in the championship game, 79–67, to win their fifth OVC men's basketball tournament.

The Racers received an automatic bid to the 1991 NCAA tournament as the #13 seed in the Southeast region.

Format
All seven of the conference's members participated in the tournament field. They were seeded based on regular season conference records, with the top seed (Murray State) receiving a bye to the semifinal round. The teams were re-seeded after the opening round.

Bracket

References

Ohio Valley Conference men's basketball tournament
Tournament
Ohio Valley Conference men's basketball tournament
Ohio Valley Conference men's basketball tournament